Mothergunship is a bullet hell roguelike first-person shooter video game developed by Grip Digital and Terrible Posture Games. As with Tower of Guns, the previous game from the same developer, it features levels that are randomly created from a pool of possible elements, making each playthrough unique.

Compared to Tower of Guns, the game features cooperative gameplay online. It also features a gun crafting mechanism, which is essential to the gameplay. The developers released a demo in May 2018 to show how the gun crafting would work in the game.

The game has been compared to a mix of first-person shooter and bullet hell. It was released on July 17, 2018.

References

External links

2018 video games
First-person shooters
Video games using procedural generation
Windows games
PlayStation 4 games
Video games developed in the Czech Republic
Video games developed in the United States
Xbox One games
Unreal Engine games
Grip Digital games
Multiplayer and single-player video games